Vernon Charles Davis (born November 2, 1949) is a former American football defensive back who played one season in the National Football League (NFL) for the Philadelphia Eagles. He played college football at Western Michigan.

Early life and education
Davis was born on November 2, 1949, in Dowagiac, Michigan. He attended Dowagiac High School, where he graduated in 1967. After graduating from Dowagiac, Davis enrolled at Western Michigan University. He played three seasons of varsity football, earning letters in 1968, 1969, and 1970. As a junior in 1969, he was named second-team all-conference. As a senior, he was named co-team captain and returned seven interceptions, including one for 100 yards. Davis was included in the 1971 edition of Who's Who in American Colleges and Universities.

At Western Michigan, Davis also competed in track and field.

Professional career
After going unselected in the 1971 NFL Draft, Davis was signed by the Philadelphia Eagles. He made the final roster and appeared in the first three games before being released on October 8. His only statistic recorded was one fumble recovery. Davis wore number 16 with the Eagles.

References

1949 births
Living people
Players of American football from Michigan
American football defensive backs
Western Michigan Broncos football players
Philadelphia Eagles players